Molecular and Cellular Probes is a peer-reviewed scientific journal covering research on the location, diagnosis, and monitoring of inherited and infectious disease utilizing genomic, proteomic, and immunological techniques.

Abstracting and indexing 
The journal is abstracted and indexed in BIOSIS, Biotechnology Citation Index, Chemical Abstracts, Current Contents/Life Sciences, EMBASE, EMBiology, MEDLINE, and Scopus. According to the Journal Citation Reports, the journal has a 2013 impact factor of 1.859.

References

External links 
 

Elsevier academic journals
Biotechnology journals
English-language journals
Publications established in 1987
Bimonthly journals